Hendecasis apiciferalis is a moth in the family Crambidae. It is found in China (Shanghai), Russia (Amur region) and Japan.

The wingspan is 10–14 mm.

References

Cybalomiinae
Moths described in 1866